Bhongir, officially known as, Bhuvanagiri is a City and a district headquarters of the Yadadri Bhuvanagiri district and part of the Hyderabad Metropolitan Region of the Indian state of Telangana. The famous family hotel is Sri Laxmi Narsimha Swamy Hotel.

Etymology 
Bhuvanagiri Fort is one of the isolated monolithic rocks carved by the Western Chalukya ruler Tribhuvanamalla Vikramaditya VI and was thus named after him as Tribhuvanagiri. This name gradually became Bhuvanagiri and subsequently Bhongir.

The fort is associated with the rule of the Kakatiya queen Rudramadevi and her grandson Prataparudhra.

Administration 
The town was constituted as a city Municipality in the year 1910(fourth oldest in Telangana).  Subsequently, it constituted a Municipality in the year 1952, and recently as per the Government orders 3 Nos. Gram panchayats namely Raigiri(North East), Pagidipalli(West) & Bommaipally(South) Areas have been merged in Bhuvanagiri Municipality and town having spread over 76.537 km2. The famous Pilgrim of Lord Yadadri Lakshmi Narasimha Swamy Temple has located nearby 13 km.

Geography 

Demographics 
As of 2011 India census, Bhuvanagiri had a population of 53,339. Males constitute 51% of the population and females 49%. Bhuvanagiri has an average literacy rate of 70%, less than the national average of 74.04%; with male literacy of 78% and female literacy of 61%. 12% of the population is under 6 years of age.

As of 2012/2022 India. Bhuvanagiri is Town in Telangana state, Bhuvanagiri Mandal population in 2022 is 132,529. According to the 2011 census of India, the Total Bhuvanagiri population is 103,538 people living in this Mandal, of which 52,720 are male and 50,818 are female. The population of Bhuvanagiri in 2021 is 128,387 Literate people are 66,957 out of 38,396 are male and 28,561 are female. Total workers are 44,778 depending on multi-skills out of which 28,234 are men and 16,544 are women. A total of 5,476 Cultivators are dependent on agriculture farming out of 3,577 are cultivated by men and 1,899 are women. 9,474 people work in agricultural land as labor in Bhuvanagiri, men are 3,775 and 5,699 are women.

Politics 
Bhuvanagiri as a Lok Sabha constituency came into existence in 2008 as per the Delimitation Act of 2002.
Komatireddy Venkat Reddy is the present MP
Pailla Shekar Reddy is the present MLA

Nearest cities 
West (NH163)
Hyderabad - 48 km

South (NH161AA)
Nalgonda 70 km
Suryapet 114 km

East (NH163)
Warangal 99 km
Jangaon 42 km

North (NH161AA)
Gajwel 45 km

Transport 

 Nearest Bus station: Bhuvanagiri (Platform:16)- 0 Km
 Nearest Railway Station: Bhuvanagiri (Platform:3) Code:BG- 2.5Km
 Nearest Railway Division(All Trains): Secunderabad Code:SC-47Km
Nearest Airport: RGIA Hyderabad(Shamshabad)-69Km

Theatres 
There are Five theatres in Bhuvanagiri, including the following:
Currently after Covid, Only Two Theatres are running in Bhuvanagiri Town.
 Omkar h 70mm A/c (closed)
 Vasundhara Theatre
 Bhadradri Theatre
 KJR Theatre(Bharat Theatre-Closed)
 Neelagiri(Closed)
 Nearest Multiplex Theatre and Shopping mall are at MJR Asian Cine Square, Narapally, Hyderabad is around 25Km.

Culture 

Notable persons from the town are Raavi Narayana Reddy, Alimineti Madhava Reddy, Belli Lalitha,Sudhakar Ratnapuram and Pratyusha.

There are certain notable landmarks in the town. Bhuvanagiri Fort is one such structure.

Rock Climbing School (RCSB) 
Rock Climbing School at Bhuvanagiri Fort, Bhuvanagiri is the training center for rock climbing.

See also 
 List of towns in India by population

References

External links 

Mandal headquarters in Yadadri Bhuvanagiri district